The Serdang Raya Selatan MRT station (Working name: Serdang Raya South) is a mass rapid transit (MRT) station that will serve the suburbs of Taman Serdang Raya and Taman Serdang Perdana in Selangor, Malaysia. It is one of the stations being built as part of the Klang Valley Mass Rapid Transit (KVMRT) project on the Putrajaya Line.

Location
The station is being built near the site of Vision Home Expo near along North–South Expressway Southern Route.

Bus Services

Feeder buses

References

External links
 Serdang Raya South MRT Station | mrt.com.my
 Klang Valley Mass Rapid Transit website
 MRT Hawk-Eye View

Rapid transit stations in Selangor
Sungai Buloh-Serdang-Putrajaya Line